Walmart Inc. is the largest retailer in the world and one of the five largest corporations in the world by sales.

Stores
10,586 total units as of October 31, 2022, including 4,720 Walmart U.S. stores, 5,266 Walmart International stores and 600 Sam's Clubs

Acquisitions
PACE Membership Warehouse (converted 91 to Sam's Club )
Woolco Canada (converted to Walmart)
Asda (acquired in 1999, later sold to EG Group in 2021. Walmart retains an equity investment in Asda and a seat on the board)
McLane Company (acquired in 1993, later sold to Berkshire Hathaway in 2003)
Wertkauf hypermarkets (Germany)
Interspar hypermarkets (74 locations in Germany)
Bompreco (Brazil)
Walmart.com (started as a joint-venture, it has since been fully acquired and is a wholly owned subsidiary of Walmart)
Sonae Distribuição Brasil (Brazilian operations) - now WMS Supermercados do Brasil.
Seiyu Group - Walmart acquired a 6.1% stake in Seiyu beginning in May 2002. A majority interest (53%) was acquired in December 2005, giving Walmart effective control of the company. Walmart's stake in Seiyu was increased to 95% in December 2007, and by June 2008 the remaining shares were acquired, making it a wholly owned subsidiary. Sold a majority, 65%, in 2020 to KKR and a further 20% to Rakuten DX Solutions, leaving Walmart with 15%.
Walmart de México y Centroamérica - In December 2009, Walmart Mexico acquired Walmart's operations in Central America from Walmart Stores and two minority partners. In early 2010, the transaction was completed and Walmart México became Walmart México and Central America. Walmart holds a 68.5% stake in the combined company.
Central American Retail Holding Company (CARHCO) - formed as a joint venture in 2001 with three equal partners: Royal Ahold NV and two Central American groups: the Paiz family, the major shareholders of La Fragua; and Corporación de Supermercados Unidos (CSU). In September 2005, Walmart acquired a 33 1/3% interest in CARHCO from the Dutch retailer Royal Ahold NV. In March 2006, Walmart made an additional investment, bringing its share of the firm to 51 percent and changing its name to Wal-Mart Central America.
Cifra - Walmart's operations in Mexico started as Walmex, a joint venture between Cifra of Mexico and Wal-Mart Stores, Inc. Walmart later bought a majority interest in Cifra and changed the name to Walmart de Mexico. Walmex is independently traded on the Mexican stock exchange, although Wal-Mart Stores, Inc. holds a majority interest.
In January 2009, Walmart completed the acquisition of 58.2% of the leading Chilean retailer Distribucion y Servicio (D&S), adding brands of major importance in that market such as Híper Lider. By March 2009, Walmart had increased its stake in D&S to approximately 73%. D&S was renamed Walmart Chile. In February 2014 it was announced that Walmart had acquired the stock of the last major stockholders Mr. Felipe Ibanez Scott and Mr. Nicolas Ibáñez Scott, bringing the Walmart stake up to 99.72%. It was announced that Walmart intends to launch a cash tender offer for the remaining outstanding shares.
In June 2011, Walmart completed the purchase of 51% of Massmart, which operates stores primarily in South Africa but also operates in various Sub-Saharan African nations. Brands added to the Walmart family include Cambridge Foods, Game, Dion Wired, Makro, Builders Warehouse, Builders Express, Builders Trade Depot, CBW, Jumbo Cash and Carry, the Shield buying group, etc. In July the South African government filed an appeal  of the Competition Tribunal's decision to allow the merger with minimal conditions, this follows an appeal filed earlier by SACCAWU, a local labor union. By March 2012 the appeals court dismissed the case by the governmental ministries, but acknowledge that there were legitimate concerns about the effect of the deal on small producers and employment. The appeals court decision effectively put an end to the legal challenges to the merger.
In October 2013, Walmart announced that it would end the 50/50 agreement with Bharti Enterprises. Bharti would operate its retail stores independently, and Wal-Mart Stores, Inc takes 100% ownership of the 20 Best Price Modern Wholesale cash and carry business operating in India.
Jet.com
 Modcloth
Parcel
Art.com

Former operations
Amigo (acquired in 2002, sold to Pueblo in 2022) In June 2022,  The sale of the remaining 11 Amigo Supermarkets to Pueblo Supermarkets was announced, the brand name will remain and the 1,100 employees They will keep their jobs. On August 26, 2022, the Amigo supermarkets closed their doors at 6pm to begin the transition of Matrix companies from Walmart to Pueblo, the possible reopening of the Amigo is scheduled for September 1.
Broadstreet Financial Services Corporation (d/b/a Bank of Wal-Mart) was tentatively to be headquartered in Salt Lake City, Utah and was to operate as an Industrial Bank to processing credit, debit card and electronic check transactions for the Walmart stores. The bank was not to be open to the public and they did not intend to open or operate any branches. According to a Walmart spokesman, it was estimated that the company would have saved $245 million in costs by opening its own bank. On March 16, 2007, Walmart announced that it had officially withdrawn its application with the Utah Department of Financial Institutions.
Bud's Discount City was a unique store as retail stores go. The store chain, associated directly with Walmart itself, relied not on purchased goods for sale; but instead sold items which had been either a.) returned to a Walmart for exchange, b.) reconditioned items, such as electronics, or c.) items which had been discontinued and stock needed to be liquidated. The first location opened in 1990 and was named after Bud Walton, Sam Walton's brother and co-founder of Wal-Mart. Most Bud's Discount Stores (sometimes just called "Bud's", and until 1995 "Bud's Warehouse Outlet") were located in old Walmart storefronts, with the typical situation being a Bud's would replace the old storefront after Walmart had constructed a newer store for its main Walmart storefront, sometimes merely to satisfy existing lease agreements with those strip centers.  As Walmart transitioned from selling items they themselves purchased, to a business model where vendors rented floor space, the need for an outlet store to deal with defective and discontinued items phased out. As a result of this, the Bud's Discount City chain was phased out in 1998.
dot Discount Drugs
Helen's Arts and Crafts
Hypermart USA (joint venture, prototype store that led to Supercenters)
McLane Company (acquired in 1990, sold to Berkshire Hathaway in 2003)
OneSource nutrition centers
Save-Co Home Improvement Center
Vudu (acquired in 2010, sold to Fandango Media in 2020)
Walmart Vacations

See also
 Walmart
 Sam's Club
 Lists of corporate assets

Notes

Further information
 - About Walmart's ownership of Seiyu Group

External links
 Walmartstores.com (corporate website)
 Wal-Mart International Operations
 Walmart China
 seiyu

Walmart
Wal-Mart